NHS Tayside is an NHS board which forms one of the fourteen regions of NHS Scotland. It provides healthcare services in Angus, the City of Dundee and Perth and Kinross. NHS Tayside is headquartered at Ninewells Hospital in Dundee; one of the largest hospitals in the world.

It has three Health and Social Care Partnerships (HSCPs): Angus, Dundee and Perth and Kinross.

Performance
In July 2020 the board announced that it had achieved the Scottish Government’s 2024 target of a 90% reduction in prevalence of hepatitis C, after 1970 people were diagnosed and treated, making it the first region in the world to effectively eliminate the virus.

It signed a five-year agreement with Alcidion to deploy Miya Observations, an electronic monitoring system which alerts clinical staff when patients show signs of deterioration, in 2022.

History 
NHS Tayside was originally formed as Tayside Health Board in April 1974. It replaced the Eastern Regional Hospital Board, which itself had been created in July 1948 as a result of the creation of the National Health Service, as having the responsibility for managing hospital provision in Dundee, Angus and Perth and Kinross (the Eastern Regional Hospital Board had also had some responsibility for hospitals in north and east Fife). It also took over the functions of Dundee Mental Hospitals (Board of Management), which had been formed in 1948 to administer mental health provision within Dundee.

It was organised into three Community Health Partnerships (CHPs): Angus, Dundee and Perth, which were replaced by health and social Care Partnerships that became fully operational in April 2016.

 it is responsible for the governance of 3 major hospitals, several community hospitals and over 60 GP surgeries and other health centres. These employ over 30,000 staff.

Change of administrators
In April 2018 a new chairman and chief executive were appointed to run NHS Tayside as a "special measure" by the Scottish Government, after Health Secretary Shona Robison said there were concerns about whether NHS Tayside could manage its own finances.

Archives 

The archives of NHS Tayside and its predecessors are held by Archive Services, University of Dundee. The archives include many records relating to many of the former and current hospitals located in the Tayside area. They also include records of defunct hospitals including Dundee Royal Infirmary, Maryfield Hospital and Murthly Hospital.

Hospitals

Angus

 Arbroath Infirmary
 Stracathro Hospital, Brechin
 Whitehills Hospital, Forfar

City of Dundee

 Carseview Centre
 Dundee Dental Hospital
 King's Cross Hospital
 Ninewells Hospital (includes University of Dundee Medical School)
 Royal Victoria Hospital (Dundee)
 Tayside Children's Hospital

Perth and Kinross

Within Perth

 Murray Royal Hospital
 Perth Royal Infirmary

Outwith Perth
 Blairgowrie Community Hospital
 Crieff Community Hospital
 Pitlochry Community Hospital
 St Margaret's Hospital, Auchterarder

References

External links 
 

 
Tayside
2006 establishments in Scotland
University of Dundee
Health in Dundee
Organisations based in Dundee